The International Fund for Ireland is an independent international organisation established in 1986 by the British and Irish governments with the objectives of promoting "economic and social advance and to encourage contact, dialogue and reconciliation between nationalists and unionists throughout Ireland."

The Fund operates with co-operation and financial contributions from the governments of United States of America, Canada, Australia and New Zealand, as well as the structures of the European Union. The majority of its funding comes from the United States. , £576m / €849m, funding over 5,700 projects across the island of Ireland, has been disbursed.

References

External links
International Fund for Ireland

All-Ireland organisations
1986 establishments in Ireland
1986 establishments in the United Kingdom